Enniskillen was a United Kingdom Parliament constituency in Ireland (now in Northern Ireland, which remains part of the United Kingdom), returning one MP. It was an original constituency represented in Parliament when the Union of Great Britain and Ireland took effect on 1 January 1801.

Boundaries
This constituency was the parliamentary borough of Enniskillen in County Fermanagh.

Members of Parliament

Elections

Elections in the 1830s

Elections in the 1840s

Cole resigned by accepting the office of Steward of the Chiltern Hundreds, causing a by-election.

Elections in the 1850s
Cole resigned by accepting the office of Steward of the Chiltern Hundreds, causing a by-election.

Whiteside was appointed Solicitor-General for Ireland, requiring a by-election.

Whiteside was appointed Attorney-General for Ireland, requiring a by-election.

In order to contest the 1859 by-election in the Dublin University, Whiteside resigned by accepting the office of Steward of the Manor of Hempholme, causing a by-election.

Elections in the 1860s

Elections in the 1870s

Crichton was appointed a lord of the Treasury, causing a by-election.

Elections in the 1880s

References

The Parliaments of England by Henry Stooks Smith (1st edition published in three volumes 1844–50), 2nd edition edited (in one volume) by F.W.S. Craig (Political Reference Publications 1973)

Westminster constituencies in County Fermanagh (historic)
Constituencies of the Parliament of the United Kingdom established in 1801
Constituencies of the Parliament of the United Kingdom disestablished in 1885
Enniskillen